Severe Tropical Storm Khanun, known in the Philippines as Tropical Storm Enteng, was the first tropical cyclone to directly impact Korea in two years. It is the 8th named storm, the 3rd severe tropical storm, and overall, the 13th tropical cyclone to be monitored by the Japan Meteorological Agency (JMA) during 2012. Khanun was also the first tropical storm to make a landfall over Korea in 2012. Khanun means "jack fruit" in Thai.

Meteorological history

The low-level circulation was ill-defined, with the JTWC assessing its development potential within the next 24 hours as low. At 18:00 UTC, the Japan Meteorological Agency (JMA) upgraded the system to a tropical depression as it was moving west-northwest.

Convection continued to organize, and at 15:00 UTC, the JTWC upgraded the system to a tropical depression, giving it the unofficial designation of 08W. On July 16 at 06:00 UTC, the JMA upgraded the depression to a tropical storm, assigning it the name Khanun. The low-level circulation continued to consolidate, and at 12:00 UTC, Khanun entered the Philippine Area of Responsibility (PAR), with the PAGASA giving it the local name Enteng. It later exited the PAR at 18:00 UTC. A weak eye feature appeared on microwave imagery, and on July 17 at 11:00 UTC, Khanun made its closest approach to Okinawa, passing within  of the island.

Preparations and impact

South Korea
Losses across the country were at ₩1.5 billion (US$11.4 million).

North Korea
In North Korea, state-run media reported that at least seven people were killed in Kangwon province, with an eighth fatality reported elsewhere. It said the storm caused significant damage, destroying 650 dwelling houses, 30 public buildings, railways, roads, bridges, and various systems. Flooding from the storm inundated 3,870 homes, which left at least 16,250 homeless.

On 29 July the North Korean government dramatically raised the death toll in the country to 88, with an additional 134 injured. At least 63,000 were made homeless by the flooding, while more than 30,000 hectares of land for growing crops were submerged and will add to growing fears of another looming famine in the country. 

On 31 July United Nations staff visited flood-ravaged areas in hard-hit South Pyongan and Kangwon provinces. Heavy rain continued along the western edge of the country, including the capital Pyongyang. North Korea's official media reported that premier Choe Yong Rim visited flooded towns and discussed ways to help recovery efforts.

Aftermath

The North Korean government requested assistance from resident United Nations agencies. On 4 August, government sources announced the death toll from both Khanun and the torrential rains in late July had risen to 169, with around 400 others missing. At least 8,600 houses were destroyed and 44,000 houses were flooded, leaving more than 212,200 people homeless.

See also

Typhoon Muifa (2011)
Typhoon Halola

Notes

References

External links

JMA General Information of Severe Tropical Storm Khanun (1207) from Digital Typhoon
JMA Best Track Data of Severe Tropical Storm Khanun (1207) 
JTWC Best Track Data of Tropical Storm 08W (Khanun)
08W.KHANUN from the U.S. Naval Research Laboratory

2012 Pacific typhoon season
2012 disasters in the Philippines
Typhoons in the Philippines
2012 in Japan
2012 disasters in South Korea
2012 in North Korea
Typhoons in North Korea
Western Pacific severe tropical storms
Typhoons in South Korea
Khanun
2012 disasters in Asia